Gomphidius oregonensis, commonly known as Insidious Gomphidius is a mushroom found only in western North America, most commonly on the Pacific Coast. G. oregonensis can be distinguished by its spores which are the shortest in the genus, typically less than 14 µm long. Earlier in growth, G. oregonensis can be difficult to distinguish from other members of the genus Gomphidius, such as G. glutinosus which is the most common and widespread species. With age, the fruiting body becomes murky and rather insidious in appearance, hence its common name.

Taxonomy
Gomphidius oregonensis was first described in 1897 by botanist Charles Horton Peck. Oregonensis simply pertains to the area in which the species was first observed. Orson K. Miller made it the type species of the section Microsorus in the genus Gomphidius.

Description
Cap- At first, the cap (2–15 cm across) is convex and almost peg-like. The surface is smooth and slimy when moist. The color varies from whitish to dull pinkish or salmon when young. With age, the cap becomes depressed, more viscid and turns purplish to reddish brown. The flesh is soft and white or grayish in color.
Gills- The gills are fairly even and closely spaced, they are somewhat waxy in appearance. They are white to grayish, turning black as ripening occurs.
Stalk- The stalk is typically about 15 cm long and ranging from 1 to 5 cm in thickness. The length may be equal diameter from top to bottom or tapered, appearing swollen at the base. The color transitions from whitish in the upper portion above the veil and bright yellow below.
Veil- The veil is whitish with a thread-like texture, hidden beneath a layer of slime. The veil seems to disappear as it approaches the stalk where it forms a slimy, almost hairy ring. This ring often become blackened as the mushrooms ages and the spores begin to fall.
Spores- The spores are smooth, spindle-shaped and elliptical, measuring 10–14 µm long, the smallest in the genus Gomphidius.

Edibility
G. oregonensis might not be at the top of line for tasting. It is most certainly edible, but with its slimy texture and unattractive appeal it is not recommended. It has some use in the culinary field, but lacks value overall for edibility.

Habitat and distribution
G. oregonensis is found in western North America, most commonly on the Pacific Coast. It will be located on the ground under conifers, particularly Douglas-fir. Mushrooms may be solitary or in clusters and often in colonies with G. glutinosus and frequently with species from the genus Suillus.

References 
 
Arora, David. Mushrooms Demystified: A comprehensive Guide to the Fleshy Fungi. 2nd Ed. Berkeley: Ten Speed Press, 1986. Print.

Boletales
Fungi of North America
Fungi described in 1897
Taxa named by Charles Horton Peck